Athanasios Barakas is a Paralympian athlete from Greece competing mainly in category F11 long jump events.

Athanasios has competed in three Paralympics.  The first in 2000 in Sydney where he competed in the 100 metres and won the F11 long jump.  Four years later at the 2004 edition in his home country he competed in the 100 metres, long jump, triple jump and was part of the Greek team in the 4 x 100 metres but failed to win a medal.  This was not the case in Beijing in 2008 where he won the bronze medal in the long jump as well as competing in the triple jump.

External links
 

Paralympic athletes of Greece
Athletes (track and field) at the 2000 Summer Paralympics
Athletes (track and field) at the 2004 Summer Paralympics
Athletes (track and field) at the 2008 Summer Paralympics
Paralympic gold medalists for Greece
Paralympic bronze medalists for Greece
Greek male sprinters
Greek male long jumpers
Greek male triple jumpers
Living people
Medalists at the 2000 Summer Paralympics
Medalists at the 2008 Summer Paralympics
Year of birth missing (living people)
Paralympic medalists in athletics (track and field)
Visually impaired sprinters
Visually impaired long jumpers
Visually impaired triple jumpers
Paralympic sprinters
Paralympic long jumpers
Paralympic triple jumpers
21st-century Greek people